Cidona is an Irish apple-based soft drink that has been on sale since 1955.  It is popular in Ireland and has some sales in the United Kingdom.

It was once produced by cider producers Bulmers (part of C&C)  and comes in a distinctive green bottle. It is now part of Britvic Ireland due to C&C selling their soft drink segment in 2007.

UK version
In 1940, it was being advertised in the UK Radio Times by H. P. Bulmer as 'The newest, non-alcoholic, sparkling apple drink' and priced at 10 pence for a 'big 5 glass flagon'.

References

External links
Cidona - official site

Apple sodas
Irish cuisine
Irish drinks